Fertois is a Demonym referring to the inhabitants of any of several communes in France:
La Ferté-Alais
La Ferté-Bernard
La Ferté-Chevresis
La Ferté-Frênel
La Ferté-Gaucher
La Ferté-Loupière
La Ferté-Macé
La Ferté-sous-Jouarre

See also
La Ferté (disambiguation), similarly named communes in France